Al-Nabi Yusha'  ( was a small Palestinian village in the Galilee situated 17 kilometers to the northeast of Safad, with an elevation of 375 meters above sea level. It became part of the Palestine Mandate under British control from 1923 until 1948, when it was depopulated during the 1948 Arab-Israeli War. The village was surrounded by forest land overlooking the Hula Valley.

History
During the late eighteenth century, a family known as al-Ghul built the shrine for Nabi Yusha ("Prophet Joshua"), which included a mosque and a building for visitors, as an act of devotion. This family, also called the "servants of the shrine," numbered about fifty and were the first to settle the site. They cultivated the surrounding land, and the place subsequently evolved into a village.

In 1851/1852 van de Velde noted the wali at Al-Nabi Yusha, with an old terebinth tree.
 
In 1875  Victor Guérin  arrived at the Maqam (shrine) after walking up on a very steep and difficult path from the east. He described the shrine, dedicated by the local Muslims to Nabi Yusha''', as a building  surmounted with two small cupolas.

In 1881, the PEF's Survey of Western Palestine (SWP)  noted that the "Metawali" from nearby Qadas came to Al-Nabi Yusha' to venerate the name of Joshua.

Pottery from Rachaya Al Foukhar have been found in the village.

British Mandate era
At the end of World War I it was under French control, and the 1920 boundary agreement between Britain and French placed it in Lebanon. At the time of the census conducted by the French in 1921, the villagers were granted Lebanese citizenship. However the Boundary Commission established by the 1920 agreement shifted the border, leaving the village in Palestine. Transfer of control to the British authorities was not complete until 1924.

During the Mandate period, the British built a police station in the village.  The people of al-Nabi Yusha', all of whom were Shia Muslims, held an annual mawsim (pilgrimage) and festival  on the fifteenth of the month Sha'aban (the eighth month of the Islamic calendar). The mawsim was similar to that of the Nabi Rubin festival in southern coast of Palestine.

In the 1931 census of Palestine, the village was home to 52 residents that year (12 households), growing to 70 in  the 1945 statistics,  and 81 (18 households) by 1948 when it was depopulated. The village occupied an area of 3,617 dunams, all private except for a dunam of public property. In 1944–45 the village had 640 dunams of land used for cereals,Government of Palestine, Department of Statistics. Village Statistics, April, 1945. Quoted in Hadawi, 1970, p. 120 while 16 dunams was built-up (urban) area.

1948 war, and aftermath
Al-Nabi Yusha' was depopulated on May 16, in the 1948 Arab-Israeli War during Operation Yiftach led by Israeli army officer Yigal Allon who later became a key Israeli figure. An early attempt to take the village by Haganah forces during the operation ended in the deaths of 22 Haganah fighters, who had their corpses reportedly decapitated by the Arab forces.

Most of its residents ended up in refugee camps in Lebanon and Syria. In 1998, the descendants of al-Nabi Yusha' refugees were estimated at 499.

The Israeli moshav Ramot Naftali was established in 1945 south of the village, and since 1948 includes Al-Nabi Yusha' land. It is located close to the border between Al-Nabi Yusha' and the lands of Mallaha.Morris, 2004, pp.   361-2

The Palestinian historian Walid Khalidi described the village remains in 1992 as: "The site has been fenced in with barbed wire and is buried under rubble, making access difficult. However, some evidence of the village remains: fragments of houses, tombs in the village's cemetery, and the shrine of al-Nabi Yusha'. The two domes and arched entrance of the main part of the shrine are still intact, but the thick stone walls of the rooms attached to it are broken and the entire complex of buildings is neglected; weeds sprouts from the roof. The village site is surrounded by fig trees and cactuses. The flat lands around the site are planted by Israeli farmers with apple trees, while the sloping parts are wooded or used as pasture."

The Nabi Yusha shrine
The shrine was surveyed by the British School of Archaeology in 1994, who described it as rectangular structure formed around a courtyard, aligned north-south, which was entered through a gateway on the north end. The principal rooms were at the south end of the courtyard, with two major domed chambers, of which the west chamber was found to be the oldest in the whole shrine complex.

Alternative traditional sites for the Prophet's tomb are situated in Turkey (the shrine on Joshua's Hill, Istanbul), Jordan (An-Nabi Yusha' bin Noon, a Sunni shrine near the city of Al-SaltTomb of Prophet Yusha' (photo of the tomb; Islamic view on Prophet Yusha'/Joshua) ) and Iraq (the Nabi Yusha' shrine of Baghdad).

See also
Depopulated Palestinian locations in Israel
Metzudat Koach
Metawali
Shia villages in Palestine

References

Bibliography

 

 
 
Lamb, Franklin. Completing The Task Of Evicting Israel From Lebanon 2009-06-02
  

    
al-Qawuqji, F. (1972): Memoirs  of al-Qawuqji, Fauzi in Journal of Palestine Studies''
"Memoirs, 1948, Part I" in 1, no. 4 (Sum. 72): 27-58., dpf-file, downloadable
"Memoirs, 1948, Part II" in 2, no. 1 (Aut. 72): 3-33., dpf-file, downloadable

External links 
  Welcome To al-Nabi Yusha', Palestine Remembered
 al-Nabi Yusha', Zochrot
Survey of Western Palestine, Map 4:  IAA, SWP Wikimedia commons
 al-Nabi Yusha', at Khalil Sakakini Cultural Center
  Al-Nabi Yusha', Dr. Khalil Rizk.
 UN map of the 1947 plan
 The Destroyed Palestinian Villages on Google Earth

District of Safad
Islamic shrines in Israel
Tegart forts
Shia shrines
Arab villages depopulated during the 1948 Arab–Israeli War